A Day to Remember (often abbreviated ADTR, and previously known as End of an Era) is an American rock band from Ocala, Florida, founded in 2003 by guitarist Tom Denney and drummer Bobby Scruggs. They are known for their amalgamation of metalcore and pop-punk.  The band currently consists of vocalist Jeremy McKinnon, rhythm guitarist Neil Westfall, percussionist/drummer Alex Shelnutt and lead guitarist Kevin Skaff.

Signing with Indianola Records for their first album, And Their Name Was Treason (2005), Scruggs was replaced by Shelnutt in 2006. Later that year the band recorded For Those Who Have Heart (2007) for Victory Records. They embarked on several tours of the UK and U.S. and played at several festivals before recording and releasing Homesick (2009). While promoting Homesick on tour, Denney was replaced by Skaff. Soon after releasing their next album, What Separates Me from You (2010), the band went on a worldwide tour to promote it. Since 2011, the band has been involved in a lawsuit with Victory Records over their recording contract. In October 2013 the band was given the right to self-release new albums until a final verdict is reached. They released their fifth album, Common Courtesy, that month. In 2016, the band released their sixth album, Bad Vibrations. They released their seventh album You're Welcome on March 5, 2021, which marked their first release under Fueled by Ramen.

History

Early years and debut album (2003–2006)

After all playing in different groups in the Ocala music scene, singer Jeremy McKinnon, guitarists Neil Westfall and Tom Denney, bassist Joshua Woodard, and drummer Bobby Scruggs came together in 2003. Soon after, the band embarked onto playing only 7 shows in their first year of touring.

The band self-released an independent EP titled Halos for Heroes, Dirt for the Dead in 2004, which was sold at their live shows. Their eponymous and second EP, moreso a demo rather, was released in January 2005; this was a precursor to their debut studio album and contained demo versions of six songs.

They were signed to Indianola in February 2005, for which they released their debut album, And Their Name Was Treason (2005) in May that year. It went on to sell over 10,000 copies.

Woodard said, "A friend of mine said he had the AIM screenname of someone at Victory Records. I didn't believe him, but I still started communicating with the guy. We IM'ed back and forth for about six months, and it happened that we were playing [...] in a town outside of Chicago. [...] It was our first time we ever played in Illinois, yet the 50–60 kids there were singing along to our tunes like they'd been fans all their lives."

Victory Records and For Those Who Have Heart (2006–2008)

Soon after signing with Victory, the band with their new drummer Alex Shelnutt went into Zing Studios to record their second album. The album, titled For Those Who Have Heart, was released in January 2007 on Victory and peaked at number 17 on Billboards Top Heatseekers chart.

In September 2007, they posted a cover of Kelly Clarkson's song, "Since U Been Gone", on their MySpace page. This was later featured on the re-release of For Those Who Have Heart, released in February 2008, and charted at number 43 on the Top Independent Albums chart.

A Day to Remember toured the UK for the first time in January 2008, and were nominated for Best International Newcomer at the 2008 Kerrang! Awards, but lost to Black Tide.

Afterwards, the band had a lengthy tour opening for Silverstein along with The Devil Wears Prada, and Protest the Hero. They then played The Bamboozle Left on April 6 at the Verizon Amphitheater in Irvine, California, one day at the 2008 Bamboozle Festival in East Rutherford, New Jersey on May 3, as well as the Download Festival in June, and the 2008 Vans Warped Tour. Before playing the Download Festival, they toured the UK with The Devil Wears Prada and Alesana on the Road To Download Tour. In mid-2008, the band played all the U.S. dates of the "Easycore Tour" along with New Found Glory, Four Year Strong, Crime in Stereo and International Superheroes of Hardcore.

Homesick and Denney's departure (2008–2010)

A remastered version of their first album, And Their Name Was Treason, titled Old Record, was released in October 2008 through Victory. Later that month, the band recorded their third studio album, Homesick.

In December 2008, A Day to Remember toured across Australia with Parkway Drive, Suicide Silence, The Acacia Strain and Confession.

Homesick was released in February 2009 and placed at number 21 on Billboards Top 200 Listings and at number 1 on Top Independent Albums. It was featured in Rolling Stones "Top 40 Albums" that month, hitting number 21. As of July 2010, the album had sold over 200,000 copies.

Following a UK tour, A Day to Remember went on a European tour in February 2009, with the German leg of the tour supported by For The Fallen Dreams and Kenai. A Day to Remember toured the U.S. from March to May 2009 with The Devil Wears Prada, Sky Eats Airplane and Emarosa. Prior to the tour, Tom Denney had broken his wrist; filling in for him was Kevin Skaff formerly of Four Letter Lie. They toured the UK with For the Fallen Dreams and Azriel. They also toured as part of the Warped Tour 2009, played at the Download Festival 2009 and toured Asia, Australia and New Zealand in August and September.

The band contributed a track to Punk Goes Pop 2 record from Fearless, covering The Fray's "Over My Head (Cable Car)".

On June 2, the band announced that Tom Denney had left the band because he wanted to focus on his marriage, family, and recording studio. He would remain a part of the band's process of writing new material. Skaff became a permanent replacement for Denney.

"The Downfall of Us All" was released as downloadable content for the Rock Band series of video games, and "NJ Legion Iced Tea" was released as a download for Guitar Hero World Tour.

A Day to Remember were set to play Reading & Leeds Festival in 2009 but pulled out due to Neil Westfall needing surgery.

They did their first headlining tour, The Pulling Your Pud Tour, along with Parkway Drive, In Fear and Faith, and I See Stars, starting in September 2009. The band then supported Bring Me the Horizon, with guest August Burns Red, on their tour of the UK and Europe in October.

On December 16, the band released the holiday-oriented single "Right Where You Want Me to Be". A music video was also made for the song.

What Separates Me from You and lawsuit with Victory (2010–2012)

A Day to Remember performed at the 2010 Soundwave Australian music festival. They toured across the UK in March 2010 with support from Architects and Your Demise, followed by "Toursick" in North America with August Burns Red, Silverstein, Enter Shikari, Veara, and Go Radio from March 31 to May 18.

On July 14, MTV.com posted the music video for the band's latest single from Homesick, "Have Faith in Me", on their website.

According to Victory, it was claimed that the band was set to release their fourth studio album titled What Separates Me from You on October 26. The album was recorded in Ocala, Florida, with producer Chad Gilbert, who also produced Homesick, with the tracking finished in July. On September 20, A Day to Remember announced in a live video through Victory's website the name of their new album: What Separates Me from You. They then revealed the cover art for the album. The album's release was delayed a few weeks, until November 16.

In November, it was announced that A Day to Remember would play the 2011 edition of the Vans Warped Tour.

On January 6, 2011, the band showcased the official music video for the first single taken from the album, "All I Want", through an MTV premiere. The video features musicians from groups including A Day to Remember's former lead guitarist Tom Denney, as well as Vic Fuentes, Pete Wentz, Dallas Taylor, and Tim Lambesis.

On January 11, the band made their national TV debut, performing the songs "All I Want" and "Better Off This Way" on Jimmy Kimmel Live!.

Prior to Vans Warped Tour 2011, A Day to Remember headlined "The Game Changers Tour" (March – April) with support from Bring Me the Horizon, Pierce the Veil, and We Came as Romans.

On June 7, the band released the music video for the second single from the album, "All Signs Point to Lauderdale".

On December 15, it was announced that A Day to Remember planned to file suit against their label, Victory, due to breach of contract. Legal action had reportedly been initiated on May 31 of that year, with the band claiming Victory owed them over $75,000 in royalties. Victory has said that the lawsuit is actually about the band's refusal to fulfill their five- album contractual commitment, and their desire to move to a major label. A Day to Remember gave Altpress.com this statement: "A Day To Remember would like to make it clear that they did not announce nor seek any attention regarding their ongoing suit with Victory Records. This information has been public record since May of 2011 and they have no intention of speaking publicly or disparagingly regarding their disagreement with Victory. A Day To Remember will continue to release music for their fans and are looking forward to touring in 2012."

Beginning in January 2012, the band went on tour supporting Rise Against throughout the U.S., with the tour spreading over two legs and the band performing in Australia and New Zealand between two tour parts.

On February 27, the band released "2nd Sucks" as the fourth single from What Separates Me from You.

Common Courtesy (2012–2014)

On May 8, 2012, the band announced at a show in New Jersey that their upcoming album would be called Common Courtesy. On December 3, the band released a countdown on their website, counting down to December 21 but not revealing what it was counting down to. When the countdown reached zero, a new single titled "Violence (Enough Is Enough)" was released. On January 21, 2013, A Day to Remember released more information about their upcoming tour, referring to it as the Right Back at It Again tour. On March 18, McKinnon announced that the new album Common Courtesy had completed the tracking process and was going to be mixed. On March 20, Woodard posted an image on his official Twitter account, stating that the band was back "on the road again". On the same day, the first stop of their U.S. "Right Back At It Again" tour, A Day to Remember played a new track scheduled to appear on Common Courtesy, titled "Right Back at It Again". They have continued to play this new track on each stop of the Right Back at It Again tour. Asked about a release date for the album in an interview with WGRD in April, McKinnon said that "there's a date we've [...] tossed around in the last week, but I mean we haven't really set anything in stone." Asked in the same interview if Common Courtesy was going to be released on Victory, he replied that the band were "not sure", and that the lawsuit was still being settled.

On August 23, the album was announced for release on October 8, 2013. A few days prior to the release, the band won the right to self-release the album, with the band contractually obligated to owing Victory at least two more albums. McKinnon said about Victory, "The only thing [they] held above us was the right to put out this album and we won the right to put it out ourselves [...] Now it can go to a jury and good luck having a jury of random people agree that two live albums that are sold separately not count as an album, good luck with that." The band self-released the album digitally on October 8. A physical edition with additional tracks was released on November 25, by the band's own label, ADTR Records.

The band went on a UK and Europe tour in January and February 2014. In an interview in late January, McKinnon mentioned the band would film the London show on the tour, with the hopes of releasing a live album. The band toured across America throughout September and October with support acts including Bring Me the Horizon, Motionless in White and Chiodos, dubbing the venture the Parks & Devastation Tour. The band opened for blink-182 (live debut with Matt Skiba) on two dates.

Bad Vibrations (2015–2018)

On September 30, 2015, rhythm guitarist Neil Westfall announced in an interview with Ultimate Guitar that the band were casually working on new material, without a prospective release date. A Day to Remember co-headlined the Big Ass Tour in arenas with the Amity Affliction in Australia and New Zealand in December 2015, with supporting bands Motionless in White and Hands Like Houses. On March 9, 2016, "Paranoia" was premiered through Beats 1. The song was recorded with Bill Stevenson of Descendents/All. It was released as a single on 11 March. A music video was released on the same day, directed by Ethan Lader.

On June 2, 2016, a song titled "Bad Vibrations" was released, alongside a music video. It was also announced that the song would be the title track of their sixth album, Bad Vibrations. The album was released on their independent label and Epitaph Records. "Bullfight" was released as a single on July 25. "Naivety" was released as a single on August 19. "We Got This" was released as a single on September 1. The album was released on September 2. The band went on to support Blink 182 on the 2016 'California' Tour from July to October 2016. During their homecoming show in Ocala on March 18, 2017, the band were presented with keys to the city. The song "Same About You" was released to rock radio stations on January 23, 2018.

You're Welcome and departure of Woodard (2019–present)

On June 14, 2019, EDM producer Marshmello released a collaboration track with the band titled "Rescue Me" marking A Day to Remember's first new release in three years. Two months later, on August 20, 2019, the band released a new single titled "Degenerates" and revealed that they are now signed to Fueled by Ramen. During an intimate free show at the House of Vans in London on August 21, 2019, the band announced that their seventh album is titled called You're Welcome and would be released later that year.

It was eventually announced that the album would be released on November 15, but a week before this scheduled release, it was announced the album was delayed until early 2020, the band's guitarist Kevin Skaff later explained it was due to the album's mixing and artwork not being complete yet. In the meantime, the band released another single, "Resentment", on November 22. On April 15, 2020, the band released the third single "Mindreader" alongside an accompanying music video. On November 18, the band announced that their new album is set for release on March 5, 2021. They also released the fourth single "Brick Wall".

On January 25, 2021, the band held an acoustic livestream event called "Live at The Audio Compound". On January 27, the album's fifth single, "Everything We Need" was released; it was followed by an official music video on March 10. On August 2, the band announced on their social media their headlining "The Re-Entry Tour" with Asking Alexandria and Point North as supporting acts. Ticket pre-sales began the next day, and the actual sales began on August 6. On October 13, it was announced that founding bassist Joshua Woodard had left the band due to the addressed allegations of past sexual misconduct from 2020. Woodard was also involved in a 2017 car crash where he "unexpectedly crossed over three lanes of traffic" and killed a 24-year old driver. This did not surface until 2021. On December 16, the band released a music video for the song "Last Chance to Dance (Bad Friend)".

On July 21, 2022, the band released a single called "Miracle".

Musical style and influences
A Day to Remember have been described by critics as metalcore, pop punk, post-hardcore, alternative rock, melodic metalcore, melodic hardcore, pop rock, and easycore. Their song structures often follow a metalcore formula and blend into a more pop punk style chorus. AllMusic critic Eduardo Rivadavia has called this blend "pop-mosh", and also described the band as fusing "emo, hardcore, and metal." When asked in an interview with AbsolutePunk about their sound, Jeremy McKinnon stated:

Members of A Day to Remember have cited New Found Glory, Blink-182, NOFX, Bury Your Dead, Comeback Kid, Millencolin, On Broken Wings, and Seventh Star as influences.

Self Help Fest
The inaugural Self Help Fest was an idea that vocalist Jeremy McKinnon came up with while talking with his girlfriend. "She told me that most people who come [to our shows] respond like it's more than just a concert to them... It's like the music is genuinely helping them. Thus we titled our festival Self Help, because at the end of the day, that's what music's all about." The first Self Help Fest took place on March 22, 2014, at the NOS Event Center in San Bernardino, California. A Day to Remember headlined the festival, and a number of punk rock and metalcore bands also performed, including "Bring Me the Horizon, Of Mice and Men, The Story So Far, Memphis May Fire, Attila, and Letlive.

On October 4, 2014, in Philadelphia, Pennsylvania, only six months after the first festival, the line-up for the second festival was announced, with A Day to Remember, Bring Me the Horizon and the Story So Far returning.  Other bands such as The Wonder Years, Motionless in White, Chiodos, and Gnarwolves made an appearance at the festival.

A Day to Remember's third Self Help Fest took place in San Bernardino on March 7, 2015. A Day to Remember did not perform, but they did produce the festival along with Fly South Music Group and a few other agencies.

A Day to Remember did perform at the fourth festival, held on March 19, 2016, at the NOS Events Center in San Bernardino.

In 2017, for the first time in the festival's history, four shows will be played: Philadelphia, Pennsylvania on September 10, 2017, Orlando, Florida on September 30, Detroit, Michigan on October 7, and San Bernardino on March 3, 2018. Bands have yet to be announced.

Band members

Current members
 Jeremy McKinnon – lead vocals (2003–present)
 Neil Westfall – rhythm guitar, backing vocals (2003–present)
 Alex Shelnutt – drums (2006–present)
 Kevin Skaff – lead guitar, backing vocals (2009–present)

Former members
 Bobby Scruggs – drums (2003–2006)
 Tom Denney – lead guitar (2003–2009)
 Joshua Woodard – bass (2003–2021)

Timeline

Discography

Studio albums
 And Their Name Was Treason (2005)
 For Those Who Have Heart (2007)
 Homesick (2009)
 What Separates Me from You (2010)
 Common Courtesy (2013)
 Bad Vibrations (2016)
 You're Welcome (2021)

Awards and nominations
Alternative Press Music Awards

|-
|rowspan="3"| 2014 || A Day to Remember || Artist of the Year || 
|-
| Common Courtesy || Album of the Year || 
|-
| A Day to Remember || Best Live Band || 
|-
|rowspan="2"| 2015 || A Day to Remember || Best Live Band || 
|-
| "End of Me" || Best Music Video || 

''Kerrang!'' Music Awards

|-
| 2012 || A Day to Remember || Best International Band ||

References
 Citations

Sources

External links 

 
 Victory Records profile

 
Musical groups established in 2003
Metalcore musical groups from Florida
Pop punk groups from Florida
American post-hardcore musical groups
Rock music groups from Florida
Indianola Records artists
Victory Records artists
Epitaph Records artists
Fueled by Ramen artists
Musicians from Ocala, Florida
Articles which contain graphical timelines
Musical quintets
2003 establishments in Florida
Alternative rock groups from Florida
American punk rock groups